The Civil Partnerships, Marriages and Deaths (Registration etc) Act 2019 (c. 12) is an Act of Parliament of the United Kingdom which changes civil partnerships to include heterosexual couples, the way in which stillbirths are recorded and how a Coroner's inquest into stillbirths are conducted.

Background 
This Act was created in response to the unanimous judgement of the Supreme Court of the United Kingdom in the case R (on the application of Steinfeld and Keidan) v Secretary of State for International Development in 2018 that ruled after the Marriage (Same Sex Couples) Act 2013, the Government was not justified in spending years reviewing the inequality between hetrosexual and homosexual couples in relation to civil partnerships. The court made a declaration of incompatibility based on Article 14 (prohibition on discrimination) and Article 8 (right to respect for private life) of the European Convention on Human Rights (ECHR) on the basis that the Civil Partnership Act 2004 discriminates against heterosexual couples by precluding them from entering into civil partnerships.

Before this Act, the Births and Deaths Registration Act 1953 required all still-births (where a baby is still-born after 24 weeks gestation) to be registered by a registrar. Parents of babies who were still-born receive a medical certificate certifying the still-birth and, upon registration, could register the baby's name and receive a certificate of registration of still-birth. When a pregnancy ended before 24 weeks gestation, however, there was no formal process for parents to legally register the loss.

Provisions 
The Act has the following effects:

 to allow opposite sex couples to enter a civil partnership to reform how marriages are registered, and register the names of the mother of each party in a marriage or civil partnership
 to require the Secretary of State to report on whether the law should be changed to allow the registration of pregnancy losses which cannot be registered as still-births under the Births and Deaths Registration Act 1953
 to report on giving coroners powers to investigate stillborn deaths

See also 
 Civil Partnership and Certain Rights and Obligations of Cohabitants Act 2010
 Civil partnership in the United Kingdom

References

External links
 Civil Partnerships, Marriages and Deaths (Registration etc) Act 2019 at legislation.gov.uk

United Kingdom Acts of Parliament 2019
2019 in British law
Civil rights and liberties in the United Kingdom
LGBT law in the United Kingdom
2019 in LGBT history
Marriage law in the United Kingdom
Stillbirth